"Canadian Sunset" is a popular song with music by jazz pianist Eddie Heywood and lyrics by Norman Gimbel. An instrumental version by Heywood and Hugo Winterhalter reached No. 2 on the Billboard Hot 100 chart and No. 7 on the R&B chart in 1956.  A version sung by Andy Williams was also popular that year, reaching No. 7 on the Billboard chart. The Sounds Orchestral, conducted by Johnny Pearson, hit the Easy Listening chart reaching No. 14 and the Billboard Hot 100 in 1965 reaching No. 76.

Emergence as a jazz standard
The tune has been covered by a number of jazz performers beginning in the 1960s.  
Wes Montgomery (guitar) recorded the piece with small combo. The recording features his signature octave melodic technique.
Danny Gatton (guitar) playing with Buddy Emmons (pedal steel) produced a funky version of the tune that fit appropriately with the "Redneck Jazz" sound they developed (jazz played on instruments normally relegated to country music) 
George Shearing (piano) recorded the piece with his quintet along with an orchestral arrangement of his writing.
Floyd Cramer (piano)
Gene Ammons (tenor saxophone) on the 1960 album Boss Tenor
Earl Bostic (alto saxophone)
Earl Grant (organ)
The Impacts (R. Baber, H. Brooks, H. Powell, C. Mattocks and  K. Seymour) recorded a doo-wop version in 1959 that can be found on The Doo Wop Box II.
Etta Jones (vocals) recorded this tune in her album "Something Nice" 1961
Cedar Walton made it funky in the 1976 album Beyond Mobius
Sam Cooke did a version on his You Send Me album
Dean Martin recorded a version on his 1959 album A Winter Romance
Beegie Adair (piano) recorded the piece with her trio "Moments to Remember" 2009
Carey T. Smith recorded a version on his 2009 album Birdy
Horst Jankowski recorded a version on his 1965 album "More Genius of Jankowski" 
Earl Klugh recorded a version on his 2008 album "The Spice of Life".

References

1956 singles
1950s jazz standards
Songs with lyrics by Norman Gimbel
Andy Williams songs
Glen Campbell songs
Santo & Johnny songs
RCA Victor singles
Jazz compositions in F major
Songs about Canada
Songs with music by Eddie Heywood Jr.